Mark Renshaw (born 22 October 1982) is a retired Australian racing cyclist, who rode professionally between 2004 and 2019 for the , , , ,  and  teams. His most notable wins are the general classification of the 2011 Tour of Qatar, and the one-day race Clásica de Almería in 2013.

Early life and amateur career 
Renshaw, who was born in Bathurst, New South Wales, began his career as a track cyclist riding for the Bathurst Cycle Club. Being coached at club level by Mark Windsor, he showed early promise, and went on to be selected for the Western Region Academy of Sport (where Windsor remained his coach). At the Under 17s level, in the 1998 Australian Track Championships, he won gold in the Teams Pursuit (Australian Record), Scratch Race, Time Trial, and Individual Pursuit (Australian Record), and silver in the Flying 200m Time Trial.

As a first-year under 19 rider, Renshaw continued to achieve strong results on the velodrome. His results included 3rd in the time trial (behind eventual World Champion Ben Kersten and World Championship Bronze Medalist Jobie Dajka), 4th in the Individual Pursuit, 5th in the Flying 200m Time Trial, 3rd in the Sprint (again behind Dajka and Kersten who were both again top 3 in the World Championships), 1st in the Teams Pursuit (with NSW); and 1st in the Olympic Sprint (again with NSW). Renshaw was then selected to compete for Australia in the Junior World Track Championships, where he became a World Champion, alongside Jobie Dajka and Ben Kersten, in the Olympic Sprint.

As a second-year Under 19 rider, Renshaw had a very successful national track championship, mirroring that of his earlier success as a second year Under 17 rider. He was 1st in the Olympic Sprint, 1st in the Time Trial, 2nd in the Individual Pursuit, 1st in the Team Pursuit, 4th in the Keirin and 1st in the Scratch Race.  Again Renshaw was chosen to compete in the Junior World Championships. In these Championships, Renshaw added individual World Championship success to his Team's success from the previous season, returning to Australia a champion in the 1000m Time Trial, as well as defending his team's crown in the Olympic Sprint, and thus becoming a Triple World Junior Champion.

As a senior Renshaw began to concentrate more on an endurance programme, in the hope of becoming a professional road cyclist. However, in 2001, as a first year senior, he won the Overall Track World Cup in his pet event as a junior, the 1 km Time Trial. It was a transition season however, and by season's end his focus had switched to longer events.

He was an Australian Institute of Sport scholarship holder for the 2004 Athens Summer Olympic Games.

2002 was a breakthrough year for Renshaw as an endurance track cyclist. Throughout the year he placed consistently in the Points Race, Madison and Teams Pursuit. And went on to be part of the Australian Team Pursuit team that broke the World Record at the Manchester Commonwealth Games (along with Graeme Brown, Peter Dawson and Luke Roberts). He was also later part of the Australian senior World Championship-winning Team Pursuit team.

Professional career

2004–2008: Transition to road 
In 2002 Renshaw's road career also began to take off when he was selected in the Brad McGee-organized NSWIS–FDJeux Development squad. Because of Renshaw's involvement in this squad he was soon riding in France with amateur squad SCO Dijon, which opened the door for him to join the senior  squad in 2004.

Renshaw returned to the track in 2004, and in the World Championships competed in the Madison, Points Race and Team Pursuit. Renshaw crashed out in the Points race, and finished 4th in the Madison. The Australian Team Pursuit team went on to win Gold. After having raced all of the World Cup rounds in the Madison event, and in the process qualifying Australia for the Olympic spot, Renshaw was selected to ride the Points Race and the Madison at the Games. However, there was controversy when in the lead up to the event, Australian selectors chose experienced road rider, Stuart O'Grady to partner Graeme Brown over Renshaw in the madison event. Renshaw still competed in the Points Race, where he placed 6th.

Renshaw showed strong early season form, taking out the Geelong Bay Series Criterium for the second consecutive year. This led to him racing as Credit Agricole's main sprinter in the early events (with Hushovd's season yet to commence), where he picked up his first Pro-Tour victory in the first stage of his 'local' Pro-Tour event, the Tour Down Under. Renshaw went on to lead the general classification, until the penultimate Willunga Hill stage, where his lack of climbing ability meant he lost considerable time and the race lead to future teammate André Greipel.

It was during his time with Credit Agricole that Renshaw made his Tour de France debut in 2008 Tour de France, after missing the 2007 race through illness. In the 2008 race, Renshaw received great praise for his role in Hushovd's win on Stage 2 of the race.

2009 

His primary responsibility in major races was as lead-out rider for sprinter Mark Cavendish. After his first season with Columbia in 2009, Renshaw received praise from commentators and fellow riders alike for his part in Cavendish's hugely successful Tour and season in general, and was now commonly referred to as "the World's best lead-out man". Renshaw's individual highlight of the 2009 season was possibly his second-placed finish on the final stage of the Tour de France, after a lead-out that also gave Cavendish the victory.

2010: Tour de France disqualification 
After a successful first season as leadout man for Cavendish in 2009, Renshaw was primed for a big season in 2010. His planned season schedule was to ride the Tour Down Under, the Tour de France and then the UCI Road World Championships – being held for the first time 'at home' for Renshaw, in Australia. These plans soon changed when he was diagnosed with Epstein–Barr virus in the pre-season which put his whole season behind. Renshaw missed his home tour, and did not return to Europe and serious training until February. This, coincidentally, roughly matched a delayed start to Cavendish's season (due to a tooth infection), and also meant that Renshaw was peaking later for his goal of the World Championships late in the year. Renshaw's season goals remained the World Championships, the Tour de France — as leadout man for Cavendish, as well as the Tour of California, where he would again be riding for Cavendish.

During the sprint finish of stage 11 in the Tour de France, while leading out Cavendish, Renshaw was disqualified and removed from the race for head-butting ' leadout man, Julian Dean and unfair blocking of Tyler Farrar by forcing him into the barriers. After the race, Tour technical director Jean-Francois Pescheux explained, "Renshaw is out. We watched the film once and it was blatant. He head-butted Dean like in a keirin race...This is a bike race, not a gladiator's arena. Everybody could have ended up on their backs." The punishment was unprecedented, the last time someone was removed from the race for a non-doping related offence was Tom Steels in 1997, for throwing his water bottle at a competitor during the sprint finish — an offence rated much more severe and unsportsman-like. Four times Green Jersey winner, Sean Kelly disagreed: "When you consider the first movement from Dean, who was moving from right to left, the head butting was normal...".

2011 
Renshaw had a successful 2011 season, winning stage 4 and then the general classification of the Tour of Qatar – beating notable sprinters Tom Boonen, Daniele Bennati and Heinrich Haussler. Then he went on to reaffirm his reputation as the World's best lead-out man at the Tour de France – helping Mark Cavendish to five stage wins and the Green Jersey. However Renshaw's season ended in disappointment when he was controversially overlooked for the Australian World Championships team – in what was deemed a sprinter friendly circuit. It was claimed by Renshaw and others in the media that this may have been because he had not signed for new Australian Pro-Team . Renshaw responded by placing second – after leading out teammate Cavendish – in the first two stages of the Tour of Britain, before going on to win Stage 5 himself.

2012 
Renshaw signed with the Dutch  squad before the start of the 2012 season, taking the chance to race for himself rather than continuing to lead-out Cavendish. After hearing the news, Cavendish claimed that no one could do the same job Renshaw had done for him the previous three years, reiterating the point that he believed Renshaw to be the best in the world at leading out a sprinter.

Renshaw won stage 4 of the Tour of Turkey. The mass sprint was an extremely close affair with Renshaw taking the win over fellow Australian Matthew Goss. The narrow margin was impossible to distinguish with the naked eye, even on the photo-finish.

2013 
In February at the Clásica de Almería, Renshaw benefited from a good lead-out and bagged his first win of the season. In April, Renshaw crashed heavily in the final stretch of the Tour of Turkey's second stage while he was the second man on the road, causing a mass pile-up. He fractured his collarbone, suffered a concussion and lost a tooth in the accident.

On 10 July, it was announced that Renshaw would join  for the 2014 season, joining former  team-mate Mark Cavendish at the squad.

2014
In September, as his leader Cavendish did not feel on form after multiple crashes, Renshaw took sprinting duties at the Tour of Britain and prevailed in the mass gallop of Stage 2.

2015
Renshaw spent the 2015 season working as Cavendish's lead-out man, with his best personal result a third-place finish at the Clásica de Almería, which Cavendish won. On 29 September, it was announced that he had joined Cavendish and their former teammate Bernhard Eisel in signing for  – later renamed as  – for the 2016 season.

Personal life 
Renshaw has Dutch grandparents who emigrated to Australia after the Second World War. In November 2009, Renshaw announced his engagement to longtime partner Kristina Harris. They married in a private ceremony in Mudgee, New South Wales in November 2010. The couple have three children.

Major results

1997
 1st  Time trial, National Junior Road Championships
1999
 1st  Team sprint, UCI Junior Track World Championships
 National Junior Track Championships
1st  Team pursuit
1st  Team sprint
2000
 UCI Junior Track World Championships
1st  Kilo
1st  Team sprint
 1st  Time trial, National Under-23 Road Championships
 National Junior Track Championships
1st  Scratch
1st  Team pursuit
1st  Team sprint
2001
 National Track Championships
1st  Kilo
1st  Madison
1st  Points race
1st  Scratch
2002
 1st  Team pursuit, UCI Track Cycling World Championships
 Commonwealth Games
1st  Team pursuit
2nd  Points race
 National Track Championships
1st  Points race
1st  Scratch
1st  Team pursuit
2003
 1st  Madison, National Track Championships
 1st Overall Be Active Instead Criterium Series
1st Stages 2 & 3
 1st Stage 3 Niederbronn Trophée des Sources
 2nd Trofeo Città di Brescia
 7th Grote Prijs Jef Scherens
2004
 1st  Team pursuit, UCI Track Cycling World Championships
2005
 2nd Grand Prix de Denain
 9th Overall Tour Down Under
 9th Overall Grande Prémio Internacional Costa Azul
 9th Overall Herald Sun Tour
2006
 1st Tro-Bro Léon
 1st Stage 3 (TTT) Tour Méditerranéen
 3rd Overall Bay Classic Series
1st Stage 5
 8th Overall Circuit Franco-Belge
 10th Grand Prix de Villers-Cotterêts
2007
 1st  Overall Bay Classic Series
1st Stage 2
 1st Down Under Classic
 1st Stage 2 Tour de Picardie
 2nd Grand Prix de Denain
 2nd Tour de Vendée
 6th Overall Circuit Franco-Belge
2008
 1st  Overall Bay Classic Series
1st Stage 3
 1st Stage 1 Tour Down Under
 1st Stage 2 Circuit Franco-Belge
 2nd Down Under Classic
 2nd Vattenfall Cyclassics
2009
 1st Stage 1 (TTT) Giro d'Italia
 8th Grand Prix de Denain
2010
 1st Stage 4 Danmark Rundt
2011
 1st  Overall Tour of Qatar
1st Stage 4
 1st Stage 1 (TTT) Giro d'Italia
 1st Stage 5 Tour of Britain
2012
 1st Stage 4 Tour of Turkey
 2nd Paris–Brussels
 3rd Memorial Rik Van Steenbergen
 3rd Dutch Food Valley Classic
 4th Ronde van Zeeland Seaports
 5th Overall World Ports Classic
 6th Vattenfall Cyclassics
2013
 1st Clásica de Almería
 1st Stage 1 Eneco Tour
2014
 1st Stage 1 (TTT) Tirreno–Adriatico
 1st Stage 2 Tour of Britain
 5th Road race, Commonwealth Games
2015
 3rd Clásica de Almería
 9th Down Under Classic
2016
 2nd London–Surrey Classic
 5th Rund um Köln
 7th EuroEyes Cyclassics
2017 
 6th Down Under Classic

Grand Tour results timeline

References

External links 

Mark Renshaw's profile at Cycling Base

1982 births
Living people
Australian male cyclists
Australian track cyclists
Cyclists at the 2002 Commonwealth Games
Cyclists from New South Wales
Australian Institute of Sport cyclists
Presidential Cycling Tour of Turkey stage winners
Cyclists at the 2014 Commonwealth Games
Cyclists at the 2004 Summer Olympics
Olympic cyclists of Australia
Commonwealth Games gold medallists for Australia
Commonwealth Games medallists in cycling
Medallists at the 2002 Commonwealth Games